Glendon Garfield Oakley Jr. (December 16, 1996 – April 8, 2020) was a United States Army private who has been called a hero for helping escort unaccompanied children during the 2019 El Paso shooting.
His tale went viral, earning him an Army Commendation Medal, but later it prompted skeptical comments from police, who said they could not verify Oakley's claims. Authorities did not interview the people who were at the mall because of the distance and therefore cannot verify Oakley's story. “We have no independent confirmation to support his claims,” Sgt. Enrique Carrillo said. “Nobody has come forward and told us that their child or anyone else was saved.” Since then, Oakley was held at the Bell County Jail. A detail from Fort Bliss was sent to extradite him for being “absent without leave,” said Master. Sgt. Vin Stevens, an installation spokesman, offering few details.

Early life and career
Oakley was born December 16, 1996. He grew up in Killeen, Texas. He was the son of retired sergeant major Glendon Oakley Sr. (Who served for 31 years before retiring in 2011) and retired master sergeant Wendolyn D. Oakley (Who served for 20 years before retiring in 2001), and the brother of retired captain Glenda Oakley.

Oakley was recruited by the United States Army in Macon, Georgia. He graduated from Basic Combat Training and Advanced Individual Training in March 2018. He served as a private in the 1st Armored Division at Fort Bliss, and he was the recipient of the National Defense Service Medal, the Global War on Terrorism Service Medal, and the Army Service Ribbon.

El Paso shooting
On August 4, 2019, Oakley was off duty and shopping at a Foot Locker store near the Cielo Vista Mall when he became aware of the shooting. He later explained:

Oakley was praised by El Paso police Chief Greg Allen for saving many lives. During his El Paso visit on August 8, 2019, President Donald J. Trump met Oakley and remarked, "What a job he did."

Death 
Oakley was found dead in his quarters at Fort Bliss on April 8, 2020. No cause of death was stated, but the possibility of foul play was denied.

See also
James Shaw Jr.

References

1996 births
2020 deaths
People from Killeen, Texas
Military personnel from Texas
United States Army soldiers
African-American United States Army personnel
21st-century African-American people